Khai may refer to

 Khai, village in Punjab, Pakistan
 Khai Hithar, village in Punjab, Pakistan
 Khai Khurd, village in Punjab, Pakistan
 KLUU, a radio station (103.5 FM) licensed to serve Wahiawa, Hawaii, United States, which held the call sign KHAI from 2005 to 2015
 Fa Khai, king of Lan Xang